Marecka Kolej Dojazdowa was a narrow gauge railway in Poland connecting Warsaw with Marki and Radzymin, it operated from 1896 to 1974. Originally built to 800 mm gauge, it was regauged to 750 mm in 1951.

Route

References
 Warszawa – Radzymin line at Baza Kolejowa (in Polish)

External links

Defunct railroads
800 mm gauge railways in Poland
Transport in Warsaw
Wołomin County